The Museum of Islamic Art is a museum located in Ghazni, Afghanistan. It is located in Rauza, a suburb of Ghazni. The museum was first opened by the Italian Archaeological Mission in 1966 in the restored sixteenth-century Mausoleum of Abd al-Razzaq to display artifacts of the Islamic period. Work was halted during the war with the Soviet Union after 1979 in which several of its artifacts were damaged. It was since restored in 2004–2007. A number of artifacts unearthed in the Ghazni area are also found in museums in Kabul.

See also 
 List of museums in Afghanistan

References

Ghazni
Museums in Afghanistan
Museum of Islamic Art, Ghazni
Art museums established in 1966
Museum of Islamic Art